T59, T.59 or T-59 may refer to :
 Type 59, a 1958 Chinese version of the ubiquitous Soviet T-54A tank
 Bugatti T59, a 1936 racing car driven by Jean-Pierre Wimille at the Algerian Grand Prix
 Slingsby T.59 Kestrel, a British glider

and also :
 T59, Trin-i-tee 5:9 a band with a song "Listen" elected Urban Recorded Song of the Year at Dove Awards of 2008
 T-59, an active Indian Navy Seaward class defense boat